Norway–UK cable may refer to:
HVDC Norway–UK
NorSea Com 1 (cable system)